Claude van der Straaten, also spelt Vanderstaaten and Vanderstraaten (1905 – 1962) was a cricketer who played on Ceylon's first tour in 1932–33.

Van der Straaten attended St. Joseph's College, Colombo. He was a renowned hitter in Ceylon. Playing for Burgher Recreation Club in a senior club match against Colombo Cricket Club in January 1931 he hit 232 in 90 minutes, including 20 sixes and 15 fours.

He took part in Ceylon's tour of India in 1932-33, but was not successful. An Indian journalist described him as having considerable talent but lacking discrimination in his hitting. His highest score was 41, batting at number eight in the first of the two matches against India.

Van der Straaten later moved to Perth, Western Australia. Playing in a 10-a-side railways club match in 1950 for Perth Goods, he took all nine wickets for 23. He died in Perth in June 1962.

References

External links

1905 births
1962 deaths
Sri Lankan cricketers
All-Ceylon cricketers
Alumni of Saint Joseph's College, Colombo
Burgher Recreation Club cricketers
Australian people of Sri Lankan descent